Break Up 100 (分手１００次) is a 2014 Hong Kong romantic comedy film directed by Lawrence Cheng.

Plot
Sam (Cheng) and his girlfriend Barbara (Chau) open up a joint cafe - the "LA Cafe Pillowcase". It later becomes a hotspot for recently separated couples to share their stories and memorabilia from past relationships.

Cast
Ekin Cheng 
Chrissie Chau 
Ivana Wong
C AllStar
Miriam Yeung
Eric Kot
Chin Kar-Lok
Angela Tong

Reception
The film has earned HK$7.03 million in Hong Kong.

On South China Morning Post's 48 Hours magazine, Yvonne Teh gave the film 3 out of 5 stars.

References

2014 romantic comedy films
Hong Kong romantic comedy films
2010s Hong Kong films